Vicenta García Miranda (August 1816 – 1877) was a Spanish Romantic poet.

Biography
Vicenta García Miranda was born in Campanario in August 1816, the daughter of Antonio García Miranda, a pharmacist and lover of poetry and classical literature. Due to her father's illness, which kept him bedridden for eleven years, the family had to move to the house of a paternal uncle, which made it difficult for the future writer to study. She married medical student Antonio Ángel de Salas in July 1833, had a son in 1841, who died at eleven months, and was widowed in 1843. These sad events set the tone for a large part of her poetry.

In 1845, after reading a poem by Carolina Coronado, she felt that she could also write poetry. Reading Coronado's verses provoked a violent reaction in her that led to a personal rebirth and her poetic awakening. In her poem "La poetisa de aldea" (The Village Poetess), a reflection on one from Coronado, she claims the marginal figure of the female poet, alone and isolated in her literary work. She wrote a letter of introduction with two poems, and they began a long friendship in which Coronado was not only her friend but also her mentor. Thanks to Coronado, an ode by García Miranda was published in the magazine El Guadiana, dedicated to Diego García de Paredes, also from Extremadura.

The Liceo promoted the creation of a mixed-gender academy, and at its inauguration, a tribute was also paid to García Miranda and other writers. There she read her poems and wrote "Vamos a vindicar a Extremadura" (We are Going to Vindicate Extremadura) for the occasion.

She organized a literary gathering at her house from 1849 to 1875, from noon to 1:00 pm, which was attended by the intellectuals of Campanario. In 1855, she published an anthology of 75 poems, Flores del valle. Her last poems are from 1865 and 1866, and some were written at the Portuguese health resort Caldas da Rainha, where she resided on her doctor's advice. She died in Campanario in 1877.

At De Caldas da Rainha, she met a doctor with whom she maintained a friendship that was reflected in her letters. In them she shares her discouragement at her physical decline and progressive blindness. But she also informs him of her poems and prose writings. She expresses why she abandoned poetry in her later years – she initially began writing to alleviate the loneliness due to the deaths of her husband and son. Having a wide circle of literary friends, and their daily tertulia took away that need to write.

Work
Her only published book, Flores del valle, comprises 75 poems with different themes. One of them is women and their position of submission to men, together with the need to seek new horizons. This was related to the topic of Romanticism: the escape from reality and the search for the exotic, as well as the desire for freedom, which is shown in the poem "A una calandria". She also defended women's role as poets, as proclaimed in the poem "Alzad, hermosas, la abatida frente". Another recurring theme in her poetry is nature revaluing the wild, in which she finds the faithful reflection of her poetic self.

Hermandad Lírica
The influence of Carolina Coronado's poetry on García Miranda's is undeniable, with the latter considered to be one of her disciples. They were most active in the years from 1845 to 1955. Many of their poems are homoerotic, including several of García Miranda's. This was accepted at the time since it was understood as a support network between women poets. Furthermore, lesbianism was not seen as subverting the social order.

Recognition
There are streets named for Vicenta García Miranda in Badajoz and in her hometown of Campanario.

References

External links
 Flores del valle at Biblioteca Nacional de España

1816 births
1877 deaths
19th-century Spanish women writers
Writers from Extremadura
People from Badajoz
Romantic poets
Spanish women poets